Elia Lythrodonta is a Cypriot football club which is based in Lythrodontas in Nicosia. The club was founded in 1919 and the football team at 1939. The team was playing sometimes in Cypriot Third Division and in Cypriot Fourth Division. "Elia" means Olive in Greek language.

Honours
 Cypriot Fourth Division: 1
1993–94

References

Football clubs in Cyprus
Association football clubs established in 1939